The Defence Secretary (IAST: Rakṣā Saciva) is the administrative head of the Ministry of Defence. This post is held by a senior Indian Administrative Service of the rank of secretary to the Government of India. The current Defence Secretary is Shri. Giridhar Aramane, I.A.S.

As a secretary to the Government of India, the Defence Secretary ranks 23rd on Indian order of precedence, along with all other Secretaries to the Government of India, and Lieutenant Generals in the grade of Army Commander.

Powers, responsibilities and postings 
Defence Secretary is the administrative head of the Ministry of Defence, and is the principal adviser to the Minister of Defence on all matters of policy and administration within the Ministry of Defence.

The role of Defence Secretary is as follows:
 To act as the administrative head of the Ministry of Defence. The responsibility in this regard is complete and undivided.
 To act as the chief adviser to the Defence Minister on all aspects of policy and administrative affairs.
 To represent the Ministry of Defence before the Public Accounts Committee of the Parliament of India.
 The Defence Secretary is responsible for coordinating the activities of the other departments (Department of Defence Production, Department of Military Affairs, Department of Ex-Servicemen Welfare and Department of Defence Research and Development) in the Ministry of Defence.
 To act as the first among equals among the secretaries in the Ministry of Defence.

Emolument, accommodation and perquisites 
The Defence Secretary is eligible for a diplomatic passport. The official earmarked residence of the Defence Secretary is 7, New Moti Bagh, New Delhi, a Type-VIII bungalow.

The salary and emolument in this rank is equivalent to chief secretaries of state governments and to Vice Chief of the Army Staff/commanders and officers in the rank of Lieutenant General and its equivalents in the Indian Armed Forces.

List of Defence Secretaries

See also 
 Cabinet Secretary of India
 Home Secretary of India
 Foreign Secretary of India
 Finance Secretary of India

References

Bibliography 

 
 

Civil Services of India
Indian government officials
Indian Administrative Service officers
Ministry of Defence (India)